Velagalapalem is a village in Rajavommangi Mandal, Alluri Sitharama Raju district in the state of Andhra Pradesh in India.

Geography 

Demographics 
 India census, Velagalapalem had a population of 594, out of which 294 were male and 300 were female. The population of children below 6 years of age was 9%. The literacy rate of the village was 52%.

References 

Villages in Rajavommangi mandal